A list of animated feature films that were first released in 1974.

See also
 List of animated television series of 1974

References

Feature films
1974
1974-related lists